Alexandra Flinn (born October 23, 1966) is an American writer of novels for young adults. Her books have appeared on the New York Times and USA Today Bestseller lists and have been translated into over twenty foreign languages. Many of her books have made the American Library Association Best Books for Young Adults lists, as well as Quick Picks for Reluctant Young Adult Readers. Many of her novels are modernized versions of classic fairy tales.

Personal life
Flinn was born in Long Island, New York and grew up in Syosset, New York and Miami, Florida. At the age of five, she started thinking about being a writer and submitted early efforts to magazines like Highlights, which did not publish them. At twelve, she moved to Palmetto Bay, Florida, a suburb of Miami, where she still lives. She struggled to make friends at her new school, and she has said that this experience inspired much of her writing for young adults, particularly her book, Breaking Point.

She graduated from Miami-Palmetto High School and was in a performing arts program called PAVAC (Performing And Visual Arts Center), which inspired some of her book, Diva. She graduated from the University of Miami with a degree in vocal performance (opera), then went to law school at Nova Southeastern University. She practiced law for 10 years before quitting her day job to devote herself full-time to writing, following the acceptance of her third book.

Books
Breathing Underwater (2001), chosen as a Top 10 ALA Best Books for Young Adults and won the Maryland Black-Eyed Susan Award
	
Breaking Point (2002), chosen as a Quick Pick for Reluctant Young Adult Readers
Nothing to Lose (2004), chosen as a Booklist Top 10 Youth Mystery, American Library Association Best Book for Young Adults, and an American Library Association Quick Pick for Reluctant Young Adult Readers
Fade to Black (2005)
Diva (2006), a sequel to Breathing Underwater
A Kiss in Time (2009), a modern version of Sleeping Beauty
Cloaked (2011), based upon several fairy tales, including The Frog Prince, The Shoemaker and the Elves, and The Six Swans
Towering (2013), a retelling of Rapunzel
Girls of July (2019)

Kendra Chronicles series
Beastly (2007), won the Detroit Public Library's Author Day Award and was a #1 New York Times bestseller after being adapted into a 2011 film
Beastly: Lindy's Diary (2012), an original e-book and also published as part of a special edition of Beastly
Bewitching (2012), a retelling of Cinderella, with mini-stories about Hansel and Gretel, The Princess and the Pea, and The Little Mermaid
Mirrored (2015), a retelling of Snow White
Beheld (2017), based upon several fairy tales, including Little Red Riding Hood, Rumpelstiltskin, East of the Sun and West of the Moon, and The Ugly Duckling

References

External links
 Official blog
 
 

1966 births
American children's writers
American young adult novelists
21st-century American novelists
Living people
People from Syosset, New York
American women novelists
American women children's writers
People from Palmetto Bay, Florida
Novelists from Florida
University of Miami Frost School of Music alumni
Nova Southeastern University alumni
21st-century American women writers
Women writers of young adult literature
Writers from Glen Cove, New York
Novelists from New York (state)